The Apprentice is a reality talent game show franchise originally aired in 2004 in the United States.

Created by U.S.-based British producer Mark Burnett, the show depicts contestants from around the country with various professional backgrounds in an elimination-style competition to become an apprentice to a businessman. The show was originally hosted by real estate magnate Donald Trump, who was also one of the producers. Burnett developed the show after previous success in bringing Survivor to the U.S. Since its premiere, The Apprentice has spawned several licensed international versions as well as unlicensed imitations.

Original series

The U.S. version of The Apprentice is the first version of the reality game show franchise. It was broadcast on NBC and billed as "The Ultimate Job Interview". The show depicted a group of 15–18 businessmen and -women competing in an elimination competition for a one-year, US$250,000 contract to run one of real estate magnate Donald Trump's companies.

The first season aired during the winter and spring of 2004, executive-produced by Mark Burnett, Jay Bienstock, and Trump, who also hosts the show. The show led Trump to become known for his fateful catch phrase "You're Fired!". The theme song for the show is "For the Love of Money" by The O'Jays, and other themes and underscore are written by composers Mark T. Williams and Jeff Lippencott of Ah2 Music.

During Donald Trump's reign over the show, the contestants lived communally in a suite at Trump Tower in New York City and the boardroom showdown was with Trump and two of his associates (usually Carolyn Kepcher, former chief operating officer (COO) and general manager for the Trump National Golf Club, and George H. Ross, Executive Vice President and Senior Counsel, The Trump Organization). Season 6 saw the show move to Los Angeles. On May 14, 2007, NBC announced the show was not on its fall 2007 schedule, but that a decision to cancel or renew it had not yet been made. On May 19, 2007, Trump announced that he was "moving on from The Apprentice", effectively ending the series. However, on May 22, NBC responded by saying Trump still had a year left on his contract. On July 16, 2007, NBC renewed the show with a sequel series, Celebrity Apprentice, The sequel debuted with season seven on January 3, 2008. The eighth season of The Apprentice premiered on NBC on March 1, 2009. Similar to the previous season, all contestants were celebrities playing for charity. The ninth season of The Apprentice  began in Spring 2010, also featuring a celebrity cast.

In June of 2016, Trump announced his campaign to run for President of the United States of America. He made several racially-charged remarks during his speech and was subsequently fired by NBC.  Actor and former Governor of California Arnold Schwarzenegger replaced Trump, beginning in Season 15.

International versions
There are currently over 70 winners of the format, the first being Bill Rancic of the United States.

Overview

Africa

Pan-African
An African version, The Apprentice Africa, is hosted by advertising magnate and co-founder of Insight Communications, Biodun Shobanjo. The Apprentice Africa is based in Lagos, Nigeria. It is aired in Nigeria on (Nigerian Television Authority), Silverbird TV, Super Screen, and MBI Television; Ghana on (TV3); Kenya on (KTN); Uganda on (WBS); and Tanzania (TBC1). It premiered in February 2008. Eighteen contestants on the show come from Nigeria, Kenya, Uganda, Ghana, Cameroon, and Republic of Guinea. Owner Patrick E. Isibor and Jajaebu Kamarou.

The maiden edition of The Apprentice Africa was won by Isaac Dankyi-Koranteng, a 31-year-old Sales Manager from Ghana. Isaac beat Eunice Omole, a Nigerian American in a final show that saw most of the evicted contestants supporting the winner. Isaac was hired for Bank PHB Plc and will be assigned special responsibilities, by the Managing Director and CEO of the bank, which include research and development of products, and roll-out strategy for the bank in new markets, with supervision by the Apprentice Africa "CEO", Mr. Biodun Shobanjo.

South Africa
The South African version that aired on SABC3 is hosted by Tokyo Sexwale, a mining magnate. During the live finale 22 September, Sexwale hired the final two—Zanele Batyashe, 24, and Khomotso Choma, 34, which not only elicited anger from viewers, but also resulted in complaints across the country after the announcement was made. Later, US Series 4 winner Randal Pinkett recommended Trump not do so in the finale (See US Series 4) after he pondered hiring the runner-up, something which may have been inspired by this incident. The catch phrase Tokyo Sexwale used was "You're dismissed!"

Asia

Pan-Asian

The Asian version of The Apprentice was aired on AXN Asia. Tony Fernandes, the entrepreneur behind the successful AirAsia airline carrier, was the host for this version. It was revived in 2021 as The Apprentice: ONE Championship Edition, with Chatri Sityodtong, CEO of ONE Championship as the new host of the series.

Indonesia 
Media mogul Peter F. Gontha is the host. The show, the first Apprentice spin-off in Asia, started on 3 October 2005, and aired every Monday on 21.30 Western Indonesian Time (GMT +7) on the television station Indosiar. According to the show's official website, the apprentice winner, a 29-year-old male whose name is Fendi Gunawan Liem, will be earning a salary of 600 million rupiahs, equivalent to about US$66,000.

Malaysia
The Apprentice Malaysian version spin-off in Asia started on October 3, 2005, and aired every Monday on 22.30 Malaysia time (GMT+8) on the television station TV3.  The catchphrase is "", or "you are fired".

Cross-continent

Pan-Arab
Real estate tycoon Mohamed Ali Alabbar hosts the Arabic version from Dubai called . The show has not started yet on LBC Lebanon.

Russia
In Russia the show is called Candidate and is broadcast on the TNT channel. The first season in 2005 was hosted by restaurant tycoon Arkady Novikov, and the winner, Tatyana Burdelova, was hired as the CEO for one of Novikov's companies. The second season in late summer of 2006 was hosted by the mining, metals, banking and property tycoon Vladimir Potanin. As of January 2007, Potanin's personal wealth is estimated to be $14.2 billion (roughly 369 billion rubles) , which makes him the richest host of any version of the show so far.

Candidate failed to attract a Russian audience. British TV producer Peter Pomerantsev credited Russian culture with its failure, writing, "The usual way to get a job in Russia is not by impressing at an interview, but by what is known as blat – 'connections'. Russian society isn't much interested in the hard-working, brilliant young business mind."

Turkey
Turkey's version is hosted by one of that country's most successful businessmen, Tuncay Özilhan the CEO of Anadolu Group. Ahmet Isik was the winner of the first season.

Europe

Belgium
In Belgium, VT4 broadcast  on 1 March 2006. Rob Heyvaert from Capco hired Claudia Schiepers from 16 candidates. Claudia Schiepers worked for Capco for almost 4 years, in both the UK and New York. Taping of the show happened in 2005 from May through July, mostly in the city of Antwerp.

Denmark
Hosted by Klaus Riskaer Pedersen in the Danish version. Louise Holm was hired at the end of the first season.

Estonia
The Estonian version called  was hosted by Armin Karu, the owner of the Olympic Entertainment Group (casinos and hotel chains). It was shown on TV3 at the fall of 2007.

Finland
Former talk show host and current consulting firm owner Jari Sarasvuo hosted the Finnish version on MTV3, called  (slang term for "deal"). Olli Rikala was the winner of the first season, although his competitor in the final was also hired, as well three of the other competitors. The show was aired in spring 2005.

The second season was shown in Autumn 2009. The winner of the second season was Antti Seppinen. He was hired as the marketing manager of urban area project in Sipoo (Sipoonranta). The third season was shown in Autumn 2010 and Harry Harkimo continued as a host. The winner of the third season was former Olympic track cycler Mira Kasslin. She was hired as the manager of hotel project in Hanko.

Germany
In September 2004, German TV station ProSieben aired an adaptation of The Apprentice called Hire or Fire, produced by and starring John de Mol. The show was cancelled after the first episode due to low ratings.

From October 2004 to January 2005, German TV station RTL aired an adaptation of The Apprentice called Big Boss. The show was hosted by former soccer manager Reiner Calmund, and the winner received a prize of €250,000 ($300,000 at the time) for starting her or his own business. One candidate was eliminated at the end of each episode with the phrase  (you are excused). The show scored fair to poor ratings and was not renewed for another season.

Ireland

An Irish version began in September 2008 on Irish broadcaster TV3. It is hosted by business mogul Bill Cullen, who has made his fortune from the motor industry, and is the owner of Renault Ireland; his company makes over €350 million annually. At the time of the announcement that Cullen would front the show, many were skeptical, saying that Cullen would not be scary or tough enough on the contestants, but many have praised his handling of the show since then. The show is based in Dublin, and the winner receives a 12-month contract working alongside Cullen with a package worth €100,000. Although TV3 have made home-produced versions of international programmes before such as The Weakest Link, The Apprentice is without doubt proving to be the most successful for the broadcaster, attracting large viewing figures, and receiving much attention from the media in Ireland. The show's catchphrase is You are fired!

The show's first scandal involved Joanna Murphy, one of the contestants. She had been in contact with her family between takes, even though it is forbidden according to the rules of the show. She used the project manager laptop to communicate with her husband, and received his help in the hope of winning a task. Her team had to collect electrical equipment, and this would be recycled. The team with the most equipment won the task. It was exposed that Joanna's family and friends were actually raiding a recycling centre near Naas Racecourse, and bringing it to her teams 'special recycling centre' down the road. Each vehicle was driven by her friends and family, but viewers and cameramen were unaware of this. Some vehicles even came in more than once, but changed number registration plates, so as not to be caught by the cameras. This stunt was exposed while in the boardroom; Cullen fired her as a result. The story was in nearly all of the national newspapers in Ireland, and was the first major scandal to hit the show. RTÉ, TV3's biggest rivals, have considered the show's success, and produced their own version of Dragon's Den as a result, in the hope of also attracting Irish viewers. Brenda then started working for Bill, as his apprentice.

The success of the first series has led to a second series being produced, which aired on TV3 in 2009. The winner of the 2009 series was Steve Rayner. He won the show despite admitting on the show that he is a recovering alcoholic and gambler.

Italy
In 2012 and 2013, Sky Italia aired first on Cielo and then on Sky Uno, two seasons of The Apprentice, with Flavio Briatore as main host.

The Netherlands
In 2005, high-profile lawyer Bram Moszkowicz offered a highly paid position ("the new Moszkowicz") in his law firm in AVRO's show . The show focused much on the character of Moszkowicz, a flamboyant man known for defending a number of very unpopular figures, most notably Desi Bouterse. Eventually Nienke Hoogervorst won out.

In 2011, a new Dutch adaptation of The Apprentice aired, called , closely following the BBC format. This time, the series centered around Dutch entrepreneur Aad Ouborg, known mostly for creating and managing the Princess Household Appliances brand. Key scenes were filmed in Rotterdam, although the Boardroom scenes take place in a theatre in the city of Breda, which is the city where Ouborg's HQ.

Norway
Produced for network TVNORGE, this was notable for being the first Apprentice spinoff in Europe. It is also notable for having the first female host—hairdressing mogul Inger Ellen Nicolaisen hosted the first season of the Norwegian version.

Spain
The Spanish version of the show, called , premiered in September 2009 on La Sexta. It was hosted by advertising mogul Lluís Bassat.

Switzerland
Swiss publishing mogul Jürg Marquard hosts the show, which first aired in April 2005 on SF1. Martin was ultimately hired at the end of the first season.

United Kingdom

Alan Sugar, founder of electronics company Amstrad, is the boss on The Apprentice in the United Kingdom. He ranks 84th on The Sunday Times Rich List 2007 with an estimated worth of around £973m. His catchphrase is "You're fired". Like the US version, the show also has a narrator, Mark Halliley. It has a very different visual and musical style to the US series, and in keeping with BBC guidelines, features no product placement. In later series, Lord Sugar offers the winner an investment, rather than direct employment.

The show started on 16 February 2005 on BBC Two, with the final episode of the first series shown on 4 May 2005. Tim Campbell, a former transport manager for the London Underground, was ultimately hired and as a result, landed a position at Amstrad with an introductory contract of 1 year with a salary exceeding £100,000. Saira Khan was fired on the series finale but has used the show to help launch a media career, including a regular column on the BBC Apprentice website and presenter of the enterprise show Beat the Boss on CBBC. James Max, a semi-finalist of the show, presents the daily Business Update on TalkSPORT alongside Ian Wright and Adrian Durham he also covers for non-sports presenters on a regular basis. He presents two weekly shows on LBC 97.3 Radio on Saturday and Sunday evenings.

A second series of The Apprentice UK began on Wednesday 22 February 2006, with the winner being Michelle Dewberry, chosen over Ruth Badger.

Series three of The Apprentice UK began on Wednesday 28 March 2007, 'promoted' to the more mainstream BBC One channel because of the series' increasing popularity. The winner was Simon Ambrose who was chosen over Kristina Grimes.

Series four of The Apprentice UK began on Wednesday 26 March 2008 on BBC One and ran for twelve weekly episodes. A record 20,000 applications were received. The winner of the 2008 series was Lee McQueen, having beaten Claire Young, Helene Speight and Alex Wotherspoon in the final, which featured four candidates instead of the usual two. The series peaked at 9.7 million viewers during the last episode, an unprecedented figure for the series.

A spin-off show, The Apprentice: You're Fired!, is shown on BBC Two straight after the BBC One broadcast. The 30-minute programme has a studio audience and interview with the fired apprentice, and Lord Sugar usually appears in the final episode of each series.

The RTL Group holds international licence rights for the show worldwide, and the show is produced by RTL's Talkback Thames. The UK opening theme is "Dance of the Knights" from Prokofiev's Romeo and Juliet, with the boardroom music provided by UK artist Dru Masters.

The BBC has also screened series 1–5 of the US version (as of winter 2010), being broadcast some considerable time after the original US airing, and in the graveyard slot (11:00 pm onwards).

The television show inspired recreation of the show in form of competitions amongst student enterprise community and in 2013 has launched as a joint event called National Student Apprentice. A number of university societies organised local 'Apprentice Competitions'.

In 2011, the 7th series was broadcast, with one major difference: the candidates would be competing for a £250,000 investment into their business for a 50% equity stake from Lord Sugar. In previous years, the prize was a six-figure job at one of Lord Sugar's companies. It is widely viewed as the reason that the show has continued to air whilst all other international versions have fallen away.

Oceania

Australia

The Australian version of The Apprentice began airing on 28 September 2009 on the Nine Network. The host is Mark Bouris, the founder and chairman of Wizard Home Loans. The series is produced by the production company FremantleMedia. Sales consultant Andrew Morello won the series and was employed as a sales director to Bouris. Morello is currently head of business development at Bouris' wealth management company, Yellow Brick Road.

The Celebrity Apprentice Australia began screening on the Nine Network in October 2011, with comedian Julia Morris winning the first season. Two more seasons followed. The show did not air in 2014, but returned in 2015 for a fourth season, with singer and model Sophie Monk winning.

New Zealand

The Apprentice New Zealand, initially aired in 2010, was hosted by Terry Serepisos. The show had 14 contestants each vying for the prize of getting a six-figure salary at one of Serepisos' companies. The show began screening on 16 February 2010 on TV2.

The series relaunched in 2021 under the title The Apprentice Aotearoa, hosted by Mike Pero. The relaunched series began screening on 10 May 2021 on TVNZ 1.

South America

Brazil
, a Brazilian version of The Apprentice hosted by marketing businessman Roberto Justus, premiered on 4 November 2004. People+Arts (a cable channel that broadcasts The Apprentice in Latin America) and Rede Record (a Brazilian broadcasting network) teamed up with Fremantle Media to create the show. For 2009 and 2010, the show had businessman João Doria, Jr. as the host.

Justus returned in 2013 to host the ninth season with a cast of candidates from previous seasons. The show was broadcast on Tuesdays and Thursdays with a total of 22 episodes. Fifteen Brazilian celebrities battled for a prize of R$1.000,000,00.

After almost five years, the reality show returned again, featuring 18 digital influencers competing for a R$1.000,000,00 cash. It was broadcast by Band and Canal Sony.

Colombia
The Colombian version is called  (literal translation from the original show's name). It was hosted by Jean-Claude Bessudo, a French-born tourism entrepreneur. The show first aired in May 2005 on Canal Caracol.

Similar programs 
The Apprentice: Martha Stewart, a spin-off with Martha Stewart
 The Cut, with Tommy Hilfiger
 Project Runway, with Heidi Klum
The Assistant, with Andy Dick, an MTV-produced parody.
The Benefactor, with Mark Cuban of the NBA Dallas Mavericks
Fire Me...Please/The Sack Race, where contestants try to get fired from their job
The Law Firm with Roy Black
My Big Fat Obnoxious Boss, a parody and hoax
The Rebel Billionaire, with Richard Branson of the Virgin Group
Ultimate Hustler, with Damon Dash
I Want To Work For Diddy, with "P'Diddy" Sean Combs
Tycoon, with Peter Jones
Dragons' Den
The Next Internet Millionaire, by Internet entrepreneur Joel Comm
50 Cent: The Money and the Power, by 50 Cent
The Grand Hustle, by T.I.
The Apprentice: ONE Championship Edition, with Chatri Sityodtong

References

External links 

 Trump not over just yet
 The Apprentice Los Angeles computer game
 The Armchair Apprentice Podcast and Blog 
 The Apprentice Official Site on Yahoo!
 NBC.com: The Apprentice season 1, season 2, season 3, season 4, season 5, season 6
 NBC.com: The Apprentice: Martha Stewart
 The site for the UK version on the BBC
 The Apprentice UK Blog at Blogger
 The site for the Asia version on the AXN Asia
 The site for the South African version on SABC3
 The site for the German version on RTL 
 The site for the Colombian version on Canal Caracol
 O Aprendiz – The Brazilian version of The Apprentice (Portuguese language)
 The site for the Finnish version on MTV3
 The site for the Indonesian version
 The site for the Spanish version on La Sexta
 NBCUniversalStore.com  – NBC's The Apprentice Store
 "Who's the Boss," a theory on how Donald Trump and Martha Stewart were picked to host the two Apprentice shows

 
Reality television series franchises
Television series by MGM Television
Television series created by Mark Burnett